Cedarock Park is a  nature preserve, historic farm, and passive-use park located near Bellemont in Alamance County, North Carolina.  The park opened in 1975 with Ronald Dean Coleman being the Parks Director at the time in the county.  He envisioned a natural area a few miles from town where anyone could come and explore some of the most beautiful property Alamance County has to offer.

Geographic setting
Cedarock Park sits on the banks of Rock Creek, a tributary of Great Alamance Creek on the northwestern side of the Cane Creek Mountains.  Located in the Piedmont region of North Carolina, the land is hilly and occasionally steep.

Human history
Prior to its use as a park, the land was used as a farm by the Garrett family beginning in 1830.  The site of the Garrett farm is part of the Cedarock Park Historic District and is known as Cedarock Historic Farm, an educational site where visitors can learn about farm life in 19th-century North Carolina and can encounter goats and donkeys.

Activities
The park has  of trails for hiking, mountain biking, and horse riding, including some trails that are handicapped accessible.  It has numerous picnic shelters, campsites, a fishing pond, playgrounds, three gazebos, and two courses.

The most popular trail at the park is the handicapped-accessible trail that leads to an old rock dam used for water diversion for a now-demolished gristmill.  The dam site is erroneously called a waterfall in several places in park literature.

References

Protected areas of Alamance County, North Carolina
Museums in Alamance County, North Carolina
Farm museums in North Carolina
Farms on the National Register of Historic Places in North Carolina
History museums in North Carolina
Parks in North Carolina
National Register of Historic Places in Alamance County, North Carolina
Protected areas established in 1973
1973 establishments in North Carolina